Pniewko may refer to the following places:
Pniewko, Łódź Voivodeship (central Poland)
Pniewko, Gryfice County in West Pomeranian Voivodeship (north-west Poland)
Pniewko, Gryfino County in West Pomeranian Voivodeship (north-west Poland)